Claude Bernard (12 July 1813 – 10 February 1878) was a French physiologist. Historian I. Bernard Cohen of Harvard University called Bernard "one of the greatest of all men of science". He originated the term milieu intérieur, and the associated concept of homeostasis (the latter term being coined by Walter Cannon).

Life and career 
Bernard was born in 1813 in the village of Saint-Julien near Villefranche-sur-Saône. He received his early education in the Jesuit school of that town, and then proceeded to the college at Lyon, which, however, he soon left to become assistant in a druggist's shop. He is sometimes described as an agnostic and even humorously referred to by his colleagues as a "great priest of atheism". Despite this, after his death Cardinal Ferdinand Donnet claimed Bernard was a fervent Catholic, with a biographical entry in the Catholic Encyclopedia. His leisure hours were devoted to the composition of a vaudeville comedy, and the success it achieved moved him to attempt a prose drama in five acts, Arthur de Bretagne.

In 1834, at the age of twenty-one, he went to Paris, armed with this play and an introduction to Saint-Marc Girardin, but the critic dissuaded him from adopting literature as a profession, and urged him rather to take up the study of medicine. This advice Bernard followed, and in due course he became interne at the Hôtel-Dieu de Paris. In this way he was brought into contact with the great physiologist, François Magendie, who served as physician at the hospital. Bernard became 'preparateur' (lab assistant) at the Collège de France in 1841.

In 1845, Bernard married Marie Françoise "Fanny" Martin for convenience; the marriage was arranged by a colleague and her dowry helped finance his experiments. In 1847 he was appointed Magendie's deputy-professor at the college, and in 1855 he succeeded him as full professor. In 1860, Bernard was elected an international member of the American Philosophical Society. His field of research was considered inferior at the time, the laboratory assigned to him was simply a "regular cellar." Some time previously Bernard had been chosen the first occupant of the newly instituted chair of physiology at the Sorbonne, but no laboratory was provided for his use. It was Louis Napoleon who, after an interview with him in 1864, repaired the deficiency, building a laboratory at the Muséum national d'Histoire naturelle in the Jardin des Plantes. At the same time, Napoleon III established a professorship which Bernard accepted, leaving the Sorbonne.
In the same year, 1868, he was also admitted a member of the Académie française and elected a foreign member of the Royal Swedish Academy of Sciences.

When he died on 10 February 1878, he was accorded a public funeral – an honor which had never before been bestowed by France on a man of science. He was interred in Père Lachaise Cemetery in Paris.

Arthur de Bretagne
At the age of 19 Claude Bernard wrote an autobiographical prose play in five acts called Arthur de Bretagne, which was published only after his death. A second edition appeared in 1943.

Works 

Patron Claude Bernard's aim, as he stated in his own words, was to establish the use of the scientific method in medicine. He dismissed several previous misconceptions, questioned common presumptions, and relied on experimentation. Unlike most of his contemporaries, he insisted that all living creatures were bound by the same laws as inanimate matter.

Claude Bernard's first important work was on the functions of the pancreas, the juice of which he proved to be of great significance in the process of digestion; this achievement won him the prize for experimental physiology from the French Academy of Sciences.

A second investigation – perhaps his most famous – was on the glycogenic function of the liver; in the course of his study he was led to the conclusion, which throws light on the causation of diabetes mellitus, that the liver, in addition to secreting bile, is the seat of an internal secretion, by which it prepares sugar at the expense of the elements of the blood passing through it.

A third research resulted in the discovery of the vasomotor system. In 1851, while examining the effects produced in the temperature of various parts of the body by section of the nerve or nerves belonging to them, he noticed that division of the cervical sympathetic nerve gave rise to more active circulation and more forcible pulsation of the arteries in certain parts of the head, and a few months afterwards he observed that electrical excitation of the upper portion of the divided nerve had the contrary effect. In this way he established the existence of both vasodilator and vasoconstrictor nerves.

The study of the physiological action of poisons was also of great interest to him, his attention being devoted in particular to curare and carbon monoxide gas. Bernard is widely credited with first describing carbon monoxide's affinity for hemoglobin in 1857, although James Watt had drawn similar conclusions about hydrocarbonate's affinity for blood acting as "an antidote to the oxygen" in 1794 prior to the discoveries of carbon monoxide and hemoglobin.

Milieu intérieur 
Milieu intérieur is the key concept with which Bernard is associated. He wrote, "The stability of the internal environment [the milieu intérieur] is the condition for the free and independent life." This is the underlying principle of what would later be called homeostasis, a term coined by Walter Cannon. He also explained that:

The living body, though it has need of the surrounding environment, is nevertheless relatively independent of it. This independence which the organism has of its external environment, derives from the fact that in the living being, the tissues are in fact withdrawn from direct external influences and are protected by a veritable internal environment which is constituted, in particular, by the fluids circulating in the body.

The constancy of the internal environment is the condition for free and independent life: the mechanism that makes it possible is that which assured the maintenance, within the internal environment, of all the conditions necessary for the life of the elements.

The constancy of the environment presupposes a perfection of the organism such that external variations are at every instant compensated and brought into balance. In consequence, far from being indifferent to the external world, the higher animal is on the contrary in a close and wise relation with it, so that its equilibrium results from a continuous and delicate compensation established as if the most sensitive of balances.

Vivisection 
Bernard's scientific discoveries were made through vivisection, of which he was the primary proponent in Europe at the time. He wrote:

The physiologist is no ordinary man. He is a learned man, a man possessed and absorbed by a scientific idea. He does not hear the animals' cries of pain. He is blind to the blood that flows. He sees nothing but his idea, and organisms which conceal from him the secrets he is resolved to discover.

Bernard practiced vivisection, to the disgust of his wife and daughters who had returned at home to discover that he had vivisected their dog. The couple was officially separated in 1869 and his wife went on to actively campaign against the practice of vivisection.

His wife and daughters were not the only ones disgusted by Bernard's animal experiments.  The physician-scientist George Hoggan spent four months observing and working in Bernard's laboratory and was one of the few contemporary authors to chronicle what went on there. He was later moved to write that his experiences in Bernard's lab had made him "prepared to see not only science, but even mankind, perish rather than have recourse to such means of saving it."

Introduction to the Study of Experimental Medicine 

In his major discourse on the scientific method, An Introduction to the Study of Experimental Medicine (1865), Bernard described what makes a scientific theory good and what makes a scientist important, a true discoverer. Unlike many scientific writers of his time, Bernard wrote about his own experiments and thoughts, and used the first person.

Known and Unknown. What makes a scientist important, he states, is how well he or she has penetrated into the unknown. In areas of science where the facts are known to everyone, all scientists are more or less equal—we cannot know who is great. But in the area of science that is still obscure and unknown the great are recognized: "They are marked by ideas which light up phenomena hitherto obscure and carry science forward."

Authority vs. Observation. It is through the experimental method that science is carried forward—not through uncritically accepting the authority of academic or scholastic sources. In the experimental method, observable reality is our only authority. Bernard writes with scientific fervor:

When we meet a fact which contradicts a prevailing theory, we must accept the fact and abandon the theory, even when the theory is supported by great names and generally accepted.

Induction and Deduction. Experimental science is a constant interchange between theory and fact, induction and deduction. Induction, reasoning from the particular to the general, and deduction, or reasoning from the general to the particular, are never truly separate. A general theory and our theoretical deductions from it must be tested with specific experiments designed to confirm or deny their truth; while these particular experiments may lead us to formulate new theories.

Cause and Effect. The scientist tries to determine the relation of cause and effect. This is true for all sciences: the goal is to connect a "natural phenomenon" with its "immediate cause". We formulate hypotheses elucidating, as we see it, the relation of cause and effect for particular phenomena. We test the hypotheses. And when an hypothesis is proved, it is a scientific theory. "Before that we have only groping and empiricism."

Verification and Disproof. Bernard explains what makes a theory good or bad scientifically:

Theories are only hypotheses, verified by more or less numerous facts. Those verified by the most facts are the best, but even then they are never final, never to be absolutely believed.

When have we verified that we have found a cause? Bernard states:

Indeed, proof that a given condition always precedes or accompanies a phenomenon does not warrant concluding with certainty that a given condition is the immediate cause of that phenomenon. It must still be established that when this condition is removed, the phenomenon will no longer appear…

We must always try to disprove our own theories. "We can solidly settle our ideas only by trying to destroy our own conclusions by counter-experiments." What is observably true is the only authority. If through experiment, you contradict your own conclusions—you must accept the contradiction—but only on one condition: that the contradiction is PROVED.

Determinism and Averages. In the study of disease, "the real and effective cause of a disease must be constant and determined, that is, unique; anything else would be a denial of science in medicine." In fact, a "very frequent application of mathematics to biology [is] the use of averages"—that is, statistics—which may give only "apparent accuracy". Sometimes averages do not give the kind of information needed to save lives. For example:

A great surgeon performs operations for stone by a single method; later he makes a statistical summary of deaths and recoveries, and he concludes from these statistics that the mortality law for this operation is two out of five. Well, I say that this ratio means literally nothing scientifically and gives us no certainty in performing the next operation; for we do not know whether the next case will be among the recoveries or the deaths. What really should be done, instead of gathering facts empirically, is to study them more accurately, each in its special determinism….to discover in them the cause of mortal accidents so as to master the cause and avoid the accidents.

Although the application of mathematics to every aspect of science is its ultimate goal, biology is still too complex and poorly understood. Therefore, for now the goal of medical science should be to discover all the new facts possible. Qualitative analysis must always precede quantitative analysis.

Truth vs. Falsification. The "philosophic spirit", writes Bernard, is always active in its desire for truth. It stimulates a "kind of thirst for the unknown" which ennobles and enlivens science—where, as experimenters, we need "only to stand face to face with nature". The minds that are great "are never self-satisfied, but still continue to strive." Among the great minds he names Joseph Priestley and Blaise Pascal.

Meanwhile, there are those whose "minds are bound and cramped". They oppose discovering the unknown (which "is generally an unforeseen relation not included in theory") because they do not want to discover anything that might disprove their own theories. Bernard calls them "despisers of their fellows" and says "the dominant idea of these despisers of their fellows is to find others' theories faulty and try to contradict them." They are deceptive, for in their experiments they report only results that make their theories seem correct and suppress results that support their rivals. In this way, they "falsify science and the facts":

They make poor observations, because they choose among the results of their experiments only what suits their object, neglecting whatever is unrelated to it and carefully setting aside everything which might tend toward the idea they wish to combat.

Discovering vs. Despising. The "despisers of their fellows" lack the "ardent desire for knowledge" that the true scientific spirit will always have—and so the progress of science will never be stopped by them. Bernard writes:

Ardent desire for knowledge, in fact, is the one motive attracting and supporting investigators in their efforts; and just this knowledge, really grasped and yet always flying before them, becomes at once their sole torment and their sole happiness….A man of science rises ever, in seeking truth; and if he never finds it in its wholeness, he discovers nevertheless very significant fragments; and these fragments of universal truth are precisely what constitutes science.

See also 
Physiology
Medicine

References 

Attribution:

Further reading
 
 Holmes, Frederic Lawrence.  Claude Bernard and Animal Chemistry: The Emergence of a Scientist.  Harvard University Press, 1974.
 Olmsted, J. M. D. and E. Harris. Claude Bernard and the Experimental Method in Medicine.  New York: Henry Schuman, 1952.
 Wise, Peter. "A Matter of Doubt – the novel of Claude Bernard". CreateSpace, 2011 and "Un défi sans fin – la vie romancée de Claude Bernard" La Société des Ecrivains, Paris, 2011.

External links

 
 
 
 Biography, bibliography, and links on digitized sources in the Virtual Laboratory of the Max Planck Institute for the History of Science
 'Claude Bernard': detailed biography and a comprehensive bibliography linked to complete on-line texts, quotations, images and more.
  Biography and genealogy of Claude Bernard.
 The Claude Bernard Museum
  Claude Bernard's works digitized by the BIUM (Bibliothèque interuniversitaire de médecine et d'odontologie, Paris), see its digital library Medic@.

1813 births
1878 deaths
People from Rhône (department)
Academic staff of the Collège de France
French Roman Catholics
French physiologists
French medical writers
Members of the Académie Française
Members of the French Academy of Sciences
Burials at Père Lachaise Cemetery
Recipients of the Copley Medal
Members of the Royal Swedish Academy of Sciences
Members of the Royal Danish Academy of Sciences and Letters
Academic staff of the École pratique des hautes études
Corresponding members of the Saint Petersburg Academy of Sciences
Academic staff of the University of Paris
Foreign Members of the Royal Society